Hypotia oxodontalis is a species of snout moth in the genus Hypotia. It was described by George Hampson in 1900 and is known from Central Asia (it was described from the Kopet Dag).

References

Moths described in 1900
Hypotiini